Duncan P B Bridge (born 1958) is a retired male badminton player from England.

Badminton career
Bridge represented England and won a gold medal in the team event and a silver medal in the mixed doubles with his sister Karen Beckman, at the 1982 Commonwealth Games in Brisbane, Queensland, Australia.

References

English male badminton players
Living people
1958 births
Commonwealth Games medallists in badminton
Commonwealth Games gold medallists for England
Commonwealth Games silver medallists for England
Badminton players at the 1982 Commonwealth Games
20th-century English people
Medallists at the 1982 Commonwealth Games